Brian Reginald Miller (born 17 April 1941) is a British actor and television personality. He is known for his music and television appearances. Miller was married to Elisabeth Sladen, who was a recurring cast member on the BBC show Doctor Who and also in her own spin off series The Sarah Jane Adventures.

Career
Miller and his wife, Elisabeth Sladen, moved to Liverpool after she left Doctor Who and they performed in a series of plays. This included a two-person production with Sladen in Mooney and his Caravans. In 1978, they appeared alongside each other in the ITV drama Send In The Girls.

He played Mr Buttle in Terry Gilliam's 1985 film Brazil.

Other television series in which he has appeared include Blake's 7 (in the episode "Horizon"), The Bill, Angels and Casualty. He has an occasional role in the radio serial The Archers as Jason the builder.

Miller briefly played Cliff Pughes in Coronation Street and Mark in Wizards vs Aliens.

Doctor Who
He has performed in various Doctor Who productions,  appearing as Dugdale in the serial Snakedance (1983), providing Dalek voices in Resurrection of the Daleks (1984) and Remembrance of the Daleks (1988), playing the role of Wiston in the 2005 stage production of The Trial of Davros, and playing the tramp Barney in the 2014 episode "Deep Breath".

Miller and Sladen performed alongside their daughter in a number of Sarah Jane Smith audio plays, released by Big Finish Productions.

Miller appeared alongside his wife in The Sarah Jane Adventures, as Harry the caretaker in the serial "The Mad Woman in the Attic" (2009).

Personal life
On 8 June 1968, Miller married actress Elisabeth Sladen in Liverpool. Their marriage lasted until her death on 19 April 2011. They had a daughter, actress Sadie Miller.

Selected filmography

References

External links 
 

1941 births
Living people
English male television actors
20th-century English male actors
21st-century English male actors